Amal (with al / el definite article) means (the) Hope or (the) Work in Arabic.

Amal, al-Amal, el-Amal, or less frequently, alAmal, elAmal, Alamal, Elamal, variation, may refer to:

Media
 Al Amal (Lebanon), a Lebanese newspaper, organ of the Phalange Party (Kataeb)
 Al Amal (Tunisia) a Tunisian newspaper
 Al-'Amal (Aden), an Aden (presently Yemen) newspaper, organ of the Aden Trade Union Congress

Politics
 Al-'Amal (Egyptian party), the Egyptian Islamic Labour Party
 Al Amal (Tunisian party), a Tunisian political party

Sports
 Alamal SC Atbara, a soccer team from Atbara, Sudan
 Al-Amal FC, a soccer team in Al-Bukayriyah, Saudi Arabia
 Al-Amal Club Stadium, a multiuse stadium in Al-Bukairiyah, Saudi Arabia
 Stade Al-Amal Atbara (English: Al-Amal Stadium Atbara), a multiuse stadium in Atbarah, Sudan
 Complexe Al Amal (English: Al Amal Complex), a tennis complex in Casablanca, Morocco

Other uses
 École Amal, a K-12 private school in Aleppo, Syria
 Farmacias El Amal, a pharmacy chain from Puerto Rico
 Al-Amal, also named Emirates Mars Mission, a Mars exploration probe

See also
 Alamal (disambiguation)
 Amal (disambiguation)
 Hope (disambiguation)
 Work (disambiguation)
 Al (disambiguation)
 El (disambiguation)